East Lake may refer to:

Places

China
East Lake Park, Shenzhen, Guangdong
East Lake (Wuhan), Hubei
East Lake Cherry Blossom Park
East Lake (Haikou), a set of twin lakes in Haikou, Hainan
East Lake Park, Fengxiang County, Shaanxi

United States
East Lake (Atlanta), a neighborhood of Atlanta, Georgia
East Lake Golf Club
East Lake (MARTA station)
East Lake (Oregon), a lake in Central Oregon
East Lake, Hillsborough County, Florida, unincorporated community
East Lake, Pinellas County, Florida, census-designated place
East Lake-Orient Park, Florida, unincorporated community
East Lake, Minnesota, an unincorporated community
East Lake, Missouri, a ghost town
East Lake, Birmingham, a neighborhood in Birmingham, Alabama (see List of neighborhoods in Birmingham, Alabama)

Other places
East Lake (New Zealand), a proposed rowing lake in Christchurch, New Zealand

Other uses
East Lake Academy, Lake Forest, Illinois, USA

See also

 
Eastlake (disambiguation)
East (disambiguation)
Lake (disambiguation)